Westlake High School is a high school in Westlake, Louisiana. It is a part of Calcasieu Parish Public Schools and was established in 1914.

History
Until Westlake High's founding in 1914, Westlake students attended Lake Charles High School. Mr. S.P. Arnett organized the establishment of a high school building on Sulphur Avenue. The building was made of red bricks painted yellow, and became known as the "yellow brick building". An auditorium/gymnasium, called the "red brick building," opened in 1936. The first yearbook, "Big Horn," was printed in 1946. That year, homecoming and American football were established. A new high school building was added to the Sulphur Avenue campus in 1949.

The high school moved to its current campus on Garden Drive in January 1967, and the Sulphur Avenue campus became known as S.P. Arnett Junior High School (now S.P. Arnett Middle School).

Campus
The current complex includes; along with classrooms, administrative space, and faculty lounges; six lecture halls/science rooms, a 1,000-seat auditorium, a library, a cafeteria, band rooms, a vocational workshop, a business laboratory, chorus rooms, a writing and language laboratory, and two sickrooms.

Athletics
Westlake High athletics competes in the LHSAA.

Championships
Football Championships
(1) State Championship: 1953

Notable alumni
David LaFleur (1992), professional football player for the Dallas Cowboys.
Joshua Ledet (2010), Third-place finisher on American Idol.

References

External links
 Westlake High School

Public high schools in Louisiana
Schools in Calcasieu Parish, Louisiana
1914 establishments in Louisiana
Educational institutions established in 1914